OTP may refer to

Businesses and organizations
OTP Bank (originally Országos Takarék Pénztár), independent financial services providers in central and eastern Europe 
OTP Ingatlanpont, Hungarian real estate brokerage firm
Office of Technology Policy, U.S. government office
Office of Telecommunications Policy, U.S. government office 1970–1978
Office of Transport and Traffic Policy and Planning, department of the Thai Government
Old Town Pizza, pizzeria in Portland, Oregon, U.S.

Technology
One-time pad, in cryptography
One-time password, a password that is valid for only one login session or transaction
One-time programmable, a type of programmable read-only memory in electronics
Open Telecom Platform, a collection of middleware, libraries, and tools written in Erlang programming language
Opposite Track Path, in optical technology such as DVD or Blu-ray
Over-temperature protection, a feature of modern computer power supply units

Transportation 
Henri Coandă International Airport (IATA: OTP), in Bucharest, Romania
On-time performance, the level of success of the service (such as a bus or train) remaining on the published schedule

Other uses
Oulun Työväen Palloilijat, a Finnish football and bandy club 
"One true pairing", a term used in media fandom
"Outside the perimeter", used by residents of Atlanta to refer to suburban areas outside Interstate 285
Opioid treatment program
Office of the President (disambiguation)